Kothachira is a village in central Kerala, southern India. The village is located on the border of Thrissur and Palakkad districts and is also known as Kothara.

Transportation

Kothachira is connected by road to the nearest towns of Pattambi and Kunnamkulam and has a Chirakkal Vishnu temple, Ayyappan kavu at south Kothachira, Appathuvalappu Devi temple, Vishnu Temple - Aathrasseri, Anthyalan Kavu on Chalissery - Peringode road, Kalari (now only Temple remains). It was the Family Temple of Malayanchath Kalarikkal Tharavadu, recently it is run by a Public Committee. There is Govt.Schools in North and South Kothachira. Kothachira there is a Mana called VENGATTURMANA which belongs to Namboodiri family. Most of the properties was belongs to them and they distributed to the ancestors of families now remains there. They paid Pattom to the land lords (Mana) after each yield for collecting the Pattom there were Kariasthans under them workers to collect it. Most of the time the farmers has to deliver the pattom like kinds (agriculture produces) the high quality out of the products.

Culture
Kothachira has been a center of traditional performing arts -- especially Kathakali, the four-century-old classical dance-drama, and Panchavadyam.Kalamandalam Gopi, one of Kathakali's all-time great actor-dancers, is from Kothachira. Kalamandalam Neelakantan Nambisan, who revolutionalised the singing style for Kathakali in the second half of the 20th century, is also from this village. It is the birthplace of Panchavadyam master in elathalam, Sekharan Nair, and the Kathakali artiste Kalamandalam Balasubramanian. The late Kathakali scholar Rama Varrier and the Kathakali musician Kalamandalam Raveendran were from Kothachira. The following persons were well known in the area during AD 1930 to AD 2000:- Kodavanparambil Malappurath Ittiri, Kodavanparambil Malappurath Kunjikrishnan, Kodavanparambil Achuthan who was Panchayath member for long period. Kodavanparambil Balan Vaidyar who was very well known ayurvedic medical practitioner. Shri. Kattekkan Parambil Thami was one of the well known agriculturist from the backward community of Kothachira. His son Shri. Manikantan was the first Computer Engineer of the area and his son Mr. K P Subramanian was Senior Manager of Canara Bank. Sri Subramanian is the founder vice president of Indian Labour Party. Kodavanparambil Sankaran was one of the largest agriculturist of the area during 20th century.

Old Illams
The village has mansions of Nampoodiri Illams, Kothara Mana being the central one. It provided a venue for several art forms -- classical, ritual and folk. Among them used to be Ayyappan Thiyyattu, traditionally performed by a Thiyyadi Nambiar family from the nearby village of Perumpilavu.

K P Vahajudeen, a very famous football player who has played for Kerala State, is from Kothachira.

Kothachira is connected to the nearest towns of Pattambi (Palakkadu) and Kunnamkulam (Trissur). Kothachira is well connected to neighboring cities by bus.

References

Kathakali
Villages in Thrissur district